Richard Warner (24 May 1911 - 14 January 1989) was an English actor. He appeared in more than one hundred films from 1938 to 1988. Also active on stage, his theatre work included Gerald Savory's George and Margaret on Broadway in 1937, and the original production of J.B. Priestley's When We Are Married in London's West End in 1938. He portrayed a judge in several episodes of Granada television's Crown Court from 1972 to 1973.

Filmography

References

External links 

1911 births
1989 deaths
English male stage actors
English male film actors
English male television actors